Mongolia competed at the World Games 2017  in Wroclaw, Poland, from 20 July 2017 to 30 July 2017.

Competitors

Sumo
Mongolia has qualified at the 2017 World Games: 

Men's Middleweight - 1 quota  
Men's Heavyweight - 1 quota
Women's Lightweight - 1 quota 
Women's Middleweight - 1 quota

References 

Nations at the 2017 World Games
2017 in Mongolian sport
2017